In mathematics, a generalized Korteweg–De Vries equation  is the nonlinear partial differential equation

The function f
is sometimes taken to be  f(u) = uk+1/(k+1) + u for some positive integer k (where the extra u is a "drift term" that makes the analysis a little easier). The case f(u) = 3u2 is the original Korteweg–De Vries equation.

References

Partial differential equations